Choir is a city in east-central Mongolia. It is the capital of Govisümber Province. Choir is officially known as Sümber sum.

History 

Choir was a military base during the Soviet period. In 1989, the Soviet anti-aircraft missile units left Choir. The longest runway in Mongolia, now abandoned, is located 25 km N from Choir, a relic of that period. In 1992, the military cantonment passed into the jurisdiction of Govisümber Province, according to the 1992 constitution.
Near the railway station is a statue commemorating Mongolia's first cosmonaut, 
Jügderdemidiin Gürragchaa.

Geography

Location
Choir lies in the Choir Depression, a lowland strip about 150 km long and 10 to 20 km wide, about 500 m lower than the surrounding upland. It lies at an altitude of 1269 m.

Climate
Choir has a semi-arid climate (Köppen climate classification BSk) with warm summers and severely cold winters. Most precipitation falls in the summer as rain, with some snow in the adjacent months of May and September. Winters are very dry.

Population 
In 2002 a population of Choir city was 7,588 (and 9,207 with rural parts of Sümber sum), up from a population of 4,500 in 1979. For the end of 2006 estimations population was 7,998.

Economy 
Choir has been declared a free enterprise zone. Along with Darkhan and Erdenet, it is one of three autonomous cities in Mongolia.
Choir has a medium-security prison which can house 460 prisoners.

Transport
It lies along the Trans-Mongolian Railway, 250 km to the southeast of Ulan Bator.  The Asian Development Bank is considering a 430-km paved road from Choir to the Chinese border, the final stage of a north-south route through the country.

References

External links

Aimag centers
Districts of Govisümber Province